René Alfonso Pinto Cofré (born 18 May 1965) is a Chilean former football player who played as a forward for clubs in Chile and Peru.

Club career
A product of Colo-Colo youth system, Pinto made his debut in the 1985 Copa Polla Gol. Then, he was loaned to Alianza Lima for the 1988 season after the tragic plane crash that suffered the Peruvian squad on 8 December 1987, alongside his fellows José Letelier, Parcko Quiroz and Francisco Huerta. The deal was for three months, but he stayed in Peru all the year. They made their debut against Coronel Bolognesi on 3 January 1988.

After a stint with Everton in 1989, he returned to Alianza Lima until 1991.

Back in Chile, he played for Deportes Linares and Audax Italiano. He retired at the age of 28.

International career
Pinto represented Chile in the 1987 Pan American Games, winning the silver medal.

After football
He graduated as both a PE teacher and a football manager. As a PE teacher, he has worked for schools and the Municipality of La Pintana.

He has continued on playing football at amateur level in clubs such as Azocenco.

He has kept a relationship with Alianza Lima in activities such as to visit them in pre-match meetings alongside others Chilean former footballers.

Honours
Chile B
 Pan American Games Silver medal: 1987

References

External links
 
 
 ENTREVISTA A LOS CHILENOS QUE VISTIERON AL EN 1987 at Match Deportes 

1965 births
Living people
Footballers from Santiago
Chilean footballers
Chilean expatriate footballers
Chile international footballers
Colo-Colo footballers
Club Alianza Lima footballers
Everton de Viña del Mar footballers
Audax Italiano footballers
Deportes Linares footballers
Chilean Primera División players
Peruvian Primera División players
Primera B de Chile players
Chilean expatriate sportspeople in Peru
Expatriate footballers in Peru
Association football forwards
Chilean football managers
Footballers at the 1987 Pan American Games
Medalists at the 1987 Pan American Games
Pan American Games silver medalists for Chile
Pan American Games medalists in football